The Himalayan horsetail (Equisetum diffusum) is a perennial that averages at 10-25 inches.  The Himalayas plant is silica rich and has a rhizomatous stem.  This shiny brown stem can have many small hair-like roots and may also grow tubers.

External links
 Equisetum diffusum {Equisetaceae} Himalayan Horsetail at the University of Connecticut Department of Ecology and Evolutionary Biology
 Equisetum diffusum D.Don in Ferns of Thailand, Laos and Cambodia at Royal Botanic Garden Edinburgh
 Equisetum diffusum D.Don - basic information on the Himalayan Horsetail at the World of Equisetum

diffusum
Flora of China
Flora of Pakistan
Flora of Assam (region)
Flora of East Himalaya
Flora of Nepal
Flora of Indo-China
Ferns of Asia